Rory Sutherland (born 1965, Usk, Monmouthshire, Wales) is a British advertising executive. He is the vice chairman of the Ogilvy & Mather group of companies. He writes a fortnightly column in The Spectator and has written several books, including Alchemy: The Power of Ideas That Don't Make Sense.

Career 
Sutherland completed school at a private institution and studied Classics at Christ's College, Cambridge, starting in 1984.

Sutherland joined Ogilvy & Mather as a graduate trainee planner in 1988, having been inspired to join the advertising industry by British TV advertising of the 1980s. He worked briefly in account management before switching to copywriting and became the creative director in 2001. From 2008 to 2012 he served as President of the Institute of Practitioners in Advertising (IPA).

In 2012 Sutherland founded the behavioural science practice within the Ogilvy Group, whose goal is develop marketing techniques inspired by the fields of psychology and economics, rather than shape customer desires through conventional advertising.

In Sutherland's book Alchemy: The Power of Ideas That Don't Make Sense, Sutherland argues that great marketing ideas are often built around a core that is profoundly irrational.

Published works 
In 2011 Sutherland published his first book, The Wiki Man, and since publication he has regularly written a column that has the same title in The Spectator magazine. In May 2019 Sutherland published his second book called Alchemy: The Magic of Original Thinking in a World of Mind-Numbing Conformity, followed by Transport For Humans: Are we nearly there yet? published in November 2021 and co-authored with Department for Transport behavioural scientist, Pete Dyson.

Personal life
Sutherland is married to Sophie Sutherland, who is a vicar at Bromley Parish Church. They have twin daughters.

References

External links
 Wiki Man columns in The Spectator.
 Sutherland discussing his book on EconTalk

British advertising executives
Marketing theorists
Branding theorists
Usk
People from Usk
Alumni of Christ's College, Cambridge
The Spectator people
1965 births
Living people